Nils Artur Lundkvist (3 March 1906 – 11 December 1991) was a Swedish writer, poet and literary critic. He was a member of the Swedish Academy from 1968.

Artur Lundkvist published around 80 books, including poetry, prose poems, essays, short stories, novels and travel books, and his works have been translated into some 30 languages. He is also noted for having translated many works from Spanish and French into Swedish. Several authors he translated were later awarded the Nobel Prize in Literature. He married the poet Maria Wine in 1936.

Biography
Artur Lundkvist was born in Perstorp Municipality, Skåne County. As a child he lived on a small farm, first in Hagstad and then in nearby Toarp. From an early age his main interest was reading and also liked wanderings in the surrounding nature. At the age of twenty Lundkvist moved to Stockholm determined to become a writer, he studied at a Folk high school and became acquainted with other young people with the same interests. His first books of poems, the anthology Fem unga and introductions of foreign modernist literature quickly established Lundkvist as a leading figure in Modernist Swedish literature in the 1930s. Lundkvist went on to publish more than 80 books in many genres and was also a prominent critic. In 1968 he was elected a member of the Swedish Academy, and was a member of the Academy's Nobel committee from 1969 to 1986. He died on 11 December 1991.

Writings

Lundkvist published his first book of poems Glöd (Glowing Embers) in 1928 and contributed to the important anthology Fem unga (Five young men) in 1929. He was one of the dominant figures in Swedish literary modernism, the most vigorous promoter of the modernist breakthrough that took place around 1930, and one of the leading poets of the period. His early works was influenced by Scandinavian and American modernists, most notably Carl Sandburg, and later by surrealism.

In the late 1940s his works became increasingly influenced by Spanish language writers like Pablo Neruda and Federico García Lorca, whose poetry he also translated to Swedish. Although he continued to publish books of poetry, including Liv som gräs (Life as grass, 1954) and Ögonblick och vågor (Moments and waves, 1962) which by many is considered to be among his finest works, prose works dominated his writings from the 1950s and onwards. In several books, starting with Malinga (1952) and leading up to late works such as Skrivet mot kvällen (Written towards the evening, 1980), his ambition was to defy genre limitations and merge prose poetry, fictional stories, short essays, personal memoirs and impressions from his many travels around the world into a new form of literature.

Artur Lundkvist was a very productive writer, and also published numerous articles, short stories, collections of literary essays, and books about his travels in South America, India, China, the Soviet Union and Africa. His later work also include several historical novels such as Snapphanens liv och död (1968, about snapphanar), Tvivla, korsfarare! (1972, about crusaders), Krigarens dikt (1976, about Alexander the Great) and "Slavar för Särkland" (1978, about vikings).

In 1966 his autobiography Självporträtt av en drömmare med öppna ögon (Self portrait of a dreamer with open eyes) was published, and in 1968 he was elected  a member of the Swedish academy.

In 1977 he was awarded the prestigious Golden Wreath of the Struga Poetry Evenings festival in Struga, North Macedonia. He died in Solna, Stockholm County.

Political activism 
Artur Lundkvist was a supporter of the Soviet Union and communism. Lundkvist himself, however, never accepted to be labelled as a communist but called himself a "free socialist".  During the Cold War, Lundkvist was an adherent of the so-called "third stance" in Swedish public debate, which purported to advocate a neutral stance in the conflict between the two superpowers. He served on the board of the pro-communist Sweden-GDR Association. He was also a member of the Swedish Peace Committee, the Swedish section of the World Peace Council, a Soviet front organization. In 1958 he was awarded the Lenin Peace Prize from the Soviet Union.

Selected works
Glöd 1928
Naket liv 1929
Jordisk prosa 1930
Svart stad 1930
Vit man 1932
Atlantvind 1932
Floderna flyter mot havet 1934
Himmelsfärd 1935
Nattens broar 1936
Sirensång 1937
Eldtema 1939
Ikarus' flykt 1939
Korsväg 1942
Dikter mellan djur och gud 1944
Skinn över sten 1947
Fotspår i vattnet 1949
Indiabrand 1950
Malinga 1952
Liv som gräs 1954
Den förvandlade draken 1955
Vindingevals 1956
Berget och svalorna 1957
Vulkanisk kontinent 1957
Ur en befolkad ensamhet 1958
Komedi i Hägerskog 1959
Utsikter över utländsk prosa 1959
Det talande trädet 1960
Agadir 1961
Berättelser för vilsekomna 1961
Sida vid sida 1962
Ögonblick och vågor 1962
Drömmar i ovädrens tid 1963
Texter i snön 1964
Sällskap för natten 1965
Självporträtt av en drömmare med öppna ögon 1966
Snapphanens liv och död 1968
Utflykter med utländska författare 1969
Himlens vilja 1970
Antipodien 1971
Tvivla, korsfarare! 1972
Lustgårdens demoni 1973
Fantasins slott och vardagens stenar 1974
Livsälskare, svartmålare 1975
Världens härlighet 1975
Krigarens dikt 1976
Sett i det strömmande vattnet 1978
Slavar för Särkland 1978
Utvandring till paradiset 1979
Skrivet mot kvällen 1980
Babylon, gudarnas sköka 1981
Sinnebilder 1982
Färdas i drömmen och föreställningen 1984

References 

1906 births
1991 deaths
People from Perstorp Municipality
Writers from Scania
Swedish-language poets
Modernist poets
Members of the Swedish Academy
Lenin Peace Prize recipients
Struga Poetry Evenings Golden Wreath laureates
Dobloug Prize winners
20th-century poets